CIS Football is the former name of U Sports football, the highest level of amateur play of Canadian football.

CIS football can also refer to:
 CIS national football team, an association football team of the Football Federation of the Soviet Union in 1992.
 CIS (rugby), a rugby union side that played matches during 1991 and 1992.
 CIS Soccer, former name of U Sports Soccer.